Edmonton/Calmar (Maplelane Farm) Aerodrome  is located  south southeast of Calmar, Alberta, Canada.

See also
List of airports in the Edmonton Metropolitan Region

References

Registered aerodromes in Alberta